Karjalan Rugby Joensuu is a Finnish rugby union club in Joensuu, Northern Karelia, and was founded in 2011. They are currently competing in the nation's Men's Div.2, the third level of rugby union in Finland. In 2018 they won the Div.2 title, but decided not to advance to Div.1.

The team also has a women's side. Recruitment of players is active for both sides.

External links
Karjalan Rugby Joensuu on Facebook
Suomen Rugbyliitto official website of the Finnish Rugby Federation

Finnish rugby union teams
Joensuu